Agüero is a village and a municipality located in the province of Huesca, Aragon, Spain. Its postal code is 22808. There are two churches in the village (Santiago and San Salvador). The 12th-century Santiago church is the main attraction in the village proper. There is also a small hotel in the village.

The Mallos are popular with mountain climbers and abseilers.

References

Bibliography 
 Antonio Ubieto Arteta, "Historia de Aragón". Los pueblos y los despoblados 1 (Ed. Anubar. Zaragoza, 1984)

External links 
 CAI Aragón-Agüero
 Románico Aragonés: Santiago de Agüero

Municipalities in the Province of Huesca